The 1983 Sokoto State gubernatorial election occurred on August 13, 1983. NPN candidate Garba Nadama won the election.

Results
Garba Nadama representing NPN won the election. The election held on August 13, 1983.

References 

Sokoto State gubernatorial elections
Sokoto State gubernatorial election
Sokoto State gubernatorial election